Joseph Keyshawn Johnson (born July 22, 1972) is an American former professional football player who was a wide receiver in the National Football League (NFL) for eleven seasons.

He played college football for the University of Southern California, and earned All-American honors.  He was selected first overall by the New York Jets in the 1996 NFL Draft. He also played professionally for the Tampa Bay Buccaneers, Dallas Cowboys and Carolina Panthers. He was one of three wide receivers to be taken first overall in NFL draft history and the most recent.

He retired from football following the 2006 season, and spent seven years as a television broadcaster for the sports channel ESPN.

Early years
Johnson was born in Los Angeles, California.  He attended Palisades High School for his sophomore and junior years and Susan Miller Dorsey High School in Los Angeles, and played high school football for the Dorsey Dons his senior year.  Though a standout prospect at football, Johnson's early life was plagued by gang crime and legal troubles.  In eighth grade, he spent nine months in a California youth facility after being arrested for possession of marijuana, cocaine and a concealed handgun.  His low SAT scores forced him to start his college football career in community college.

College career
In Johnson's first year at West Los Angeles College, he lasted just 8 games.  Eventually he just stopped showing up for practice.  "For years, I was the good kid, but I was curious and it eventually got the best of me," he later wrote. "I started hanging out with the wrong crowd and got myself into trouble."  After sitting out the following year to get his affairs in order, Johnson returned to football in 1992, and performed well enough to earn himself a transfer to University of Southern California, where he played for coach John Robinson's USC Trojans football team in 1994 and 1995. In 1994, he finished with 66 catches for 1,362 yards and 9 touchdowns.  In 1995, he finished with 102 catches for 1,434 yards and 7 touchdowns.

As a Trojan, he was twice recognized as a consensus first-team All-America selection. After the 1994 college season, Johnson helped lead the Trojans to a win in the 1995 Cotton Bowl Classic, after which he was named the game's Most Valuable Player.  The Trojans then played in the 1996 Rose Bowl, during which Johnson caught 12 passes for a Rose Bowl record 216 yards and one touchdown in the Trojans' 41–32 victory over the Northwestern Wildcats. He was named the Player of the Game. He was inducted into the Rose Bowl Hall of Fame on December 31, 2008.

While in college, Johnson appeared on the TV show Coach, as a player eligible for draft in the upcoming season. He flatly refused to be recruited to the fictional "Orlando Breakers" team for coach Hayden Fox, stating he would go to Canada to play first. Johnson graduated from USC with a B.A. in social sciences and history in 1997.

College statistics

Professional career

New York Jets
The New York Jets drafted Johnson with the top overall selection in the 1996 NFL Draft. He was the third wide receiver selected with the number one overall pick since Irving Fryar was chosen by the New England Patriots in 1984. While in New York, he played three seasons (1997–1999) under Bill Parcells, who in two seasons would turnaround the Jets from 1–15 in 1996, Johnson's rookie year to 9–7 in 1997 and 12–4 in 1998 and the franchise's first ever AFC East Division title.

One of his best performances was in a 34–24 win over the Jacksonville Jaguars in an AFC divisional playoff game after the 1998 season. In that game, Johnson caught nine passes for 121 yards and a touchdown, rushed for 28 yards and a touchdown, recovered a fumble, and intercepted a pass on defense. The Jets however, fell one game short of the Super Bowl after losing the AFC Championship Game the next week to the Denver Broncos 23–10. Johnson wrote an autobiography with ESPN's Shelley Smith, Just Give Me the Damn Ball. The book covered his rookie year experiences.

Tampa Bay Buccaneers
Johnson was traded on April 12, 2000 to the Tampa Bay Buccaneers for two first round draft choices (13th – John Abraham – and 27th – Anthony Becht – overall) in the 2000 NFL Draft.  Soon after Johnson arrived in Tampa Bay, they signed him to an 8-year, $56 million contract extension with the Buccaneers that made him the highest-paid wide receiver in the NFL.

At that time he was joining a team that had fallen one game short of the Super Bowl the previous season. In 2002 Johnson went on to win a Super Bowl with the Buccaneers after the arrival of new head coach Jon Gruden, who succeeded Tony Dungy. Johnson had 76 catches for 1,088 yards and five touchdowns; In the playoffs, he had eight catches for 125 yards and a touchdown against the Eagles, then had six grabs for 69 yards in the Super Bowl. However, his bitter relationship with Gruden (illustrated by a video clip of him yelling at Gruden on the sidelines) led to his de-activation for the final 7 games of the 2003 season. The following offseason, he was traded to the Dallas Cowboys, where he was reunited with Bill Parcells, his coach while he was with the New York Jets.

Dallas Cowboys
On March 19, 2004, the Tampa Bay Buccaneers traded him to the Dallas Cowboys for Joey Galloway, who the Cowboys had also traded two first round picks to acquire.  Reunited with his former coach Bill Parcells, Johnson lived up to his advance billing for the Cowboys in 2004, leading the team in receiving yards and tying for the lead in touchdown catches while taking over a leadership role in the locker room and on the field. On March 16, 2006, the Cowboys released Johnson to make room for recently acquired  receiver Terrell Owens.

Carolina Panthers
On March 23, 2006, Johnson signed a four-year, $14-million-dollar deal with the Carolina Panthers. Of this, he was guaranteed a $5 million signing bonus. He was expected to play opposite Steve Smith as the number two receiver.

During the Carolina Panthers' Monday Night Football game against the Buccaneers on November 13, 2006, Johnson became the first player in NFL history to score a touchdown on Monday Night Football with four teams (Jets, Buccaneers, Cowboys and Panthers). Johnson was released from the Panthers on May 1, 2007, after just one season with the team. He posted 70 receptions for 815 yards and four touchdowns in Carolina.

Retirement
On May 23, 2007, Johnson announced he was retiring from the NFL, reportedly turning down offers by several teams, including the Tennessee Titans. Titans' Head Coach Jeff Fisher, who became friends with Johnson while he played at USC, said he thought Johnson's numbers and production spoke for themselves: "He still played at a high-level last year. He takes very good care of himself," Fisher said.  "He hasn't had any injuries per season. Anytime you get a chance to bring an experienced veteran in to add to your roster then it's a good thing."  On the same day, Johnson announced he would be working as an analyst for ESPN.

On February 5, 2008, CBS4 Miami reported that Bill Parcells reached out to Johnson. Parcells reportedly told him if he was to come out of retirement there would be a spot on the Miami Dolphins roster for him.

His all-around game has earned him selection to the Pro Bowl three times – 1998 and 1999 with the N.Y. Jets and 2001 with Tampa Bay. Johnson finished his career with 814 receptions, tying him at 17th all-time with Henry Ellard for career NFL receptions. His 10,571 yards receiving is the 24th highest total in NFL history. In reaching the 600 career receptions plateau in 118 games, he tied Herman Moore for the second fewest games needed in NFL history to reach that mark, and he became one of only three players in league history (Moore and Marvin Harrison) to reach 600 receptions in fewer than 120 games. He caught 512 passes in his first 100 games to rank as the fourth most receptions in a player's first 100 games.  The other three are: Marvin Harrison (591), Sterling Sharpe (524) and Lionel Taylor (516).

To achieve this production, he has averaged 74.8 catches-per-season over his first nine seasons, and caught a pass in every one of his 135 games played over this span. This accomplishment was the second longest streak among active receivers (Harrison, 139) and the third longest streak to begin a career among all players (Marshall Faulk, 158 and Harrison, 139) at that time. For his career, Johnson recorded 60 or more catches in ten of his eleven NFL seasons. In 2001 and 2002, he became the first player in Buccaneers history to record consecutive 1,000-yard receiving seasons when he registered 1,266 yards in 2001 and 1,098 in 2002. Johnson missed only three of a possible 145 career games – including playoffs – due to injury.

NFL career statistics

Regular season

Analyst on ESPN
Johnson was part of the 2007 NFL Draft broadcasting team with Chris Berman, Mel Kiper Jr. and Chris Mortensen that aired on ESPN.  In 2007, he became an ESPN analyst for Sunday NFL Countdown, and Monday Night Countdown. Within the confines of Sunday NFL Countdown and Monday Night Countdown, Johnson invented a segment called C'mon Man!, which allows each panel member to pick a moment in the last NFL week "revolving around either the play on the field or unprofessional behavior off it" that one might consider, on some level, either inexcusable or downright laughable. Each member verbalizes what their gripe may be, while highlights of the moment that they are illustrating run around it, and then ends with the panel member stating with disdain, "C'mon man!"  He has also been an analyst on several ESPN telecasts, including pre-game shows on Sundays and Monday nights, and some radio work as well.

He was also an analyst on the ESPN Who's Now competition. He occasionally hosted Jim Rome Is Burning while Jim Rome was unavailable. On January 23, 2011, Johnson was not on Sunday NFL Countdown for Championship weekend because his mother unexpectedly died. After being briefly let go by ESPN in 2016, he was brought back to appear on SportsCenter, ESPN Radio, and other shows.

On August 17, 2020, Johnson began hosting mornings on “ESPN LA 710” KSPN, replacing “Golic and Wingo”. Johnson will be joined by basketball analyst Jay Williams, a former NBA player; and Max Kellerman, with the show being titled "KJM". ESPN says the hosts will discuss the morning’s top stories and overnight developments with their own perspective and analysis. Johnson will also regularly appear on “Get Up” and “First Take.”

Other ventures
Johnson co-founded First Picks Management in 2005 as a vehicle to pursue his business interests in the food service, hotel, and real estate industries as well as venture capital investing. He recruited Harvard Business School MBAs, Glenn and Clarence Mah, as well as his public relations and marketing agent, Ingrid Roberts, to co-lead the organization.  Johnson and his management team partnered with National Football League and National Basketball Association athletes, including Warrick Dunn, Dennis Northcutt, Terence Newman, and Joe Smith  in developing First Picks Management, a corporate website.

In November 2008, Johnson was contracted for a weekend TV Series called Keyshawn Johnson: Tackling Design. The show was on A&E in July 2009 and showcases Johnson's knowledge of interior design to help other people redecorate their homes.

In 2012, Johnson starred in Jägermeister's critically acclaimed A Stronger Bond television and digital campaign created by the award-winning advertising agency Mistress. In 2013, Johnson was announced to be a contestant on the 17th season of Dancing with the Stars. He was paired with professional dancer Sharna Burgess. On the show of September 23 he was the first celebrity voted out.

He starred on 2022's Iron Chef

Personal life
He has four children: Keyshawn Jr, Maia, London, and Vance. Keyshawn Johnson Jr. is also a wide receiver committed to play for the University of Nebraska. His nephew is current New Orleans Saints WR Michael Thomas.

On March 15, 2021, Johnson announced on his Twitter that his oldest daughter Maia had died.

References

External links

External links

1972 births
Living people
African-American players of American football
All-American college football players
American football wide receivers
Carolina Panthers players
Dallas Cowboys players
National Football League first-overall draft picks
New York Jets players
Players of American football from Los Angeles
Tampa Bay Buccaneers players
USC Trojans football players
American Conference Pro Bowl players
National Conference Pro Bowl players
National Football League announcers
West Los Angeles Wildcats football players
Participants in American reality television series
Susan Miller Dorsey High School alumni
ESPN Radio
ESPN Radio programs
ESPN people
Disney people
African-American sports journalists
Sportspeople from Los Angeles
10,000 receiving yards club